Jan Johnsen  (23 July 1941 – 8 April 2000) was a Norwegian politician.

He was born in Stavanger to Olga and Johan Johnsen. He was elected representative to the Storting for the period 1997–2001 for the Conservative Party. Upon his death he was replaced by Bent Høie.

References

1941 births
2000 deaths
Politicians from Stavanger
Conservative Party (Norway) politicians
Members of the Storting